Cheepurupalli revenue division is an administrative division in the Vizianagaram district of the Indian state of Andhra Pradesh. It is one of the three revenue divisions in the district and comprises nine mandals. It was formed on 4 April 2022 by the Y. S. Jagan Mohan Reddy-led Government of Andhra Pradesh.

Administration 
The revenue division comprises nine mandals: Cheepurupalli, Garividi, Gurla, Merakamudidam, Nellamerla, Rajam, Regidi Amadalavalasa, Santhakaviti and Vangara.

References 

2022 establishments in Andhra Pradesh
Revenue divisions in Vizianagaram district
Revenue divisions in India